

Senior Hall is a historic building on the University of California, Berkeley campus, in Berkeley, California. The rustic log cabin structure was designed by architect John Galen Howard. The building was proposed in 1903 and dedicated in 1906. It was originally used as the university's student union and run by the senior male students. A senior honor society called the Order of the Golden Bear was largely responsible for building the hall, and it held secret meetings at the hall after its construction. According to the Daily Californian, Senior Hall was largely responsible for student self-governance at Berkeley, as the hall gave seniors a place to meet and discuss campus issues. A new student union replaced the hall in 1923, but the Order of the Golden Bear continues to meet there.

Senior Hall was listed on the National Register of Historic Places in 1974.

References

External links
Senior Hall

University of California, Berkeley buildings
University and college buildings on the National Register of Historic Places in California
School buildings completed in 1906
John Galen Howard buildings
Rustic architecture in California
Log cabins in the United States
National Register of Historic Places in Berkeley, California
Log buildings and structures on the National Register of Historic Places in California
1906 establishments in California